The 2013–14 Czech First League, known as the Gambrinus liga for sponsorship reasons, was the 21st season of the Czech Republic's top-tier football league. The season began on 19 July 2013 and ended on 31 May 2014. Sparta Prague won their 36th title on 4 May 2014, after defending champions Plzeň drew against Jablonec. They ended the season with a Czech league record of 79 points out of a possible 90, winning all of their home games, and losing only one away game and drawing a further four. Sigma Olomouc and Znojmo were relegated, the latter having played its top flight debut, and the former having played in every Czech first league season since its establishment in 1993.

Teams
Hradec Králové and České Budějovice were relegated to the 2013–14 Czech 2. Liga after finishing last and second to last, respectively, in the 2012–13 season. Hradec Králové therefore returned to the second tier after three seasons in the top league, while České Budějovice left after a seven-year spell in the top flight.

The relegated teams were replaced by 2012–13 2. Liga winners Znojmo and runners-up Bohemians 1905. Bohemians thus returned to the top flight after a one-year absence. Znojmo, having never played in the top flight before, made their top-league début.

Stadiums and locations

Notes:
 Městský stadion (Znojmo) does not meet the football association criteria, therefore Znojmo are ground-sharing in Brno. Znojmo played their final fixture against Dukla Prague at Stadion v Jiráskově ulici in Jihlava as Brno also had a home fixture on the same date.

Personnel and kits

Note: Flags indicate national team as has been defined under FIFA eligibility rules. Players may hold more than one non-FIFA nationality.

 1 According to current revision of List of Czech Football League managers

Managerial changes

League table

Results

Top scorers

Average home attendance by club

See also
 2013–14 Czech Cup
 2013–14 Czech National Football League

References

External links
  

Cze
2013-14
1